Juror 8 is a 2019 South Korean legal film, based on the 1957 US film 12 Angry Men. It was released on May 15, 2019.

Plot
The story takes place in 2008 during South Korea's first jury trial. Eight ordinary citizens from different backgrounds are summoned to be jurors of a criminal trial.

Cast

Main
 Moon So-ri as Kim Joon-gyeom
 Park Hyung-sik as Kwon Nam-woo

Supporting
 Baek Soo-jang as Yoon Geu-rim
 Cha Mi-kyung as Yang Choon-ok
 Yoon Kyung-ho as Jo Jin-sik
 Seo Jeong-yeon as Byeon Sang-mi
 Jo Han-chul as Choi Yeong-jae
 Kim Hong-pa as Jang Gi-baek
 Cho Soo-hyang as Oh Soo-jeong
 Kwon Hae-hyo as president of the Court
 Tae In-ho as presiding judge
 Lee Hae-woon as associate judge
 Seo Hyun-woo as Kang Doo-sik
 Lee Yong-yi as Kang Doo-sik's mother
 Yum Dong-hun as Kang Doo-sik's uncle
 Shim Dal-gi as Kang So-ra
 Kim Hak-sun as forensic doctor
 Go Seo-hee as community center employee

Production
The first script reading took place on June 29, 2018. Principal photography began on July 7, 2018 and filming wrapped up on September 22, 2018.

Awards and nominations

Release
As of 26 May 2019, the film reached a total of 270,270 admissions grossing $1,831,951 in revenue.

References

External links
 
 

2019 films
South Korean legal films
Films set in 2008
2010s South Korean films